Baranduzchay may refer to:
 Baranduzchay-ye Jonubi Rural District